Joílson de Jesus Cardoso (born 25 May 1991), simply known as Joílson, is a Brazilian footballer who plays as a central defender for Chapecoense.

Career statistics

Honours
Criciúma
Campeonato Catarinense: 2013

Chapecoense
Campeonato Catarinense: 2020
Campeonato Brasileiro Série B: 2020

References

External links

1991 births
Living people
Brazilian footballers
Association football defenders
Campeonato Brasileiro Série A players
Campeonato Brasileiro Série B players
Campeonato Brasileiro Série C players
Criciúma Esporte Clube players
Camboriú Futebol Clube players
Clube Atlético Penapolense players
Oeste Futebol Clube players
Associação Chapecoense de Futebol players
Esporte Clube São Bento players
People from Osasco
Footballers from São Paulo (state)